Lagoa Santa may refer to the following places in Brazil:

 Lagoa Santa, Goiás
 Lagoa Santa, Minas Gerais